Janina Janecka, real name Janina Dobrzyńska (20 October 1893 – 21 February 1938) was a Polish film actress. She appeared in eleven films between 1932 and 1938.

Selected filmography
 Bolek i Lolek (1936)
 Wrzos (1938)

References

External links

1893 births
1938 deaths
20th-century Polish actresses
Actors from Łódź
Polish film actresses
Polish stage actresses